Võhandu is a river in Estonia.

Võhandu is the longest Estonian river fully in Estonian territory.

In 1963 was founded protected area in the valley of Võhandu.

References

Rivers of Estonia